Erwin Dressel (10 June 1909, in Berlin – 17 December 1972, in Berlin) was a German composer and pianist.

Following the success of his incidental music for Shakespeare's Much Ado About Nothing, Dressel wrote many operas for the Deutsche Staatsoper. He also arranged music for the radio, concertized as a pianist and wrote orchestral music, including four symphonies; as well as concertos for various instruments (including one for two saxophones).

Selected works
Opera
 Armer Columbus, opera, Op.23 (1927); libretto by Arthur Zweiniger
 Der Bär, burlesque opera in 1 act; libretto by Robert Wolfgang Schnell
 Der Kuchentanz, tragic opera in 3 acts (1927–1928); libretto by Arthur Zweiniger
 Die Laune des Verliebten, lyric opera in 1 act; libretto by Johann Wolfgang von Goethe
 Der Rosenbusch der Maria, Legend in 4 scenes (1929); libretto by Arthur Zweiniger
 Das Urteil von Zalamea, opera in 3 acts, 6 scenes, Op.50; after Lope de Vega and Arthur Zweiniger
 Die Zwillingsesel, opera in 3 acts; libretto by Arthur Zweiniger

Orchestral
 Abendmusik for chamber orchestra, Op.33
 Balladesker Marsch
 Capriccio ritmico
 Caprice fantastique
 Cassation
 Deutsche Märchen-Suite for chamber orchestra, Op.36
 Französische Ouvertüre
 Heitere Begegnungen
 Ouverture zu einem Märchenspiel, Op.47
 Rondoburleske
 Serenade II in E major for string orchestra
 Symphony in D major

Concertante
 Concerto for alto saxophone and orchestra
 Concerto for oboe, clarinet, bassoon and orchestra
 Concerto for saxophone and orchestra, Op.27
 Duo-Konzert (Double Concerto) for soprano and alto saxophones and chamber orchestra

Chamber music
 Bagatellen (Bagatelles) for saxophone and piano
 Canto variato for cello and piano
 Partita for alto saxophone (or clarinet, or viola) and piano (1965)
 Sonata for alto saxophone and piano, Op.26
 String Quartet (1928)
 Suite for violin and piano
 Trio miniature for clarinet, horn and bassoon

Piano
 Piano Sonata
 Zehn Klavierstücke (10 Piano Pieces)

Vocal
 Von allerlei Tieren ein lustig Musizieren, Song Cycle for voice and piano, Op.39

References
Joseph Clark, "Dressel, Erwin" in The New Grove Dictionary of Music and Musicians, ed. Stanley Sadie. New York: Macmillan Publishers Limited (1980): 5 629

1909 births
1972 deaths
German classical pianists
Male classical pianists
German opera composers
Male opera composers
Musicians from Berlin
20th-century classical composers
20th-century classical pianists
German male classical composers
20th-century German composers
German pianists
German male pianists
20th-century German male musicians